Chloroclystis palaearctica is a moth in the family Geometridae. It is endemic to the United Arab Emirates.

References

External links

Moths described in 1938
palaearctica
Endemic fauna of the United Arab Emirates